Sahijpur railway station is a railway station on Ahmedabad–Udaipur Line under the Ahmedabad railway division of Western Railway zone. This is situated beside Gayatri Society Road at Sahijpur Bogha in Ahmedabad of the Indian state of Gujarat.

References

Ahmedabad railway division
Railway stations in Ahmedabad